Shuli Bhanjan is a hill in the Indian state of Maharashtra. It is located near a village called Sulibhanjan, not far from Aurangabad on the way to Ellora Caves.The location is surrounded green hills and beautiful pond can be seen from the way. 

There is a Hindu temple on top of the hill along with two hot water springs. A stone which produces the sound of a metallic bell can be seen outside the temple.

The 16th-century Hindu saint Eknath is believed to have done penance (tapasya) at this location, to which he travelled daily on foot from the nearby Daulatabad fort where he was employed. He is also believed to have met his teacher Janardan Swami at Shuli Bhanjan.This place is also known for meditation place where saint Eknath maharaj used to meditate.

Mr. Pandurang (Dadasaheb) Ganorkar was the man behind the development of this temple and other facilities for the place at very initial stages.

Geography of Aurangabad, Maharashtra
Hills of Maharashtra